"A Little Is Enough" is a single written and performed by Pete Townshend, also known for being the guitarist for The Who. The track appeared on his album, Empty Glass.

Background
Pete Townshend pledged that "A Little Is Enough" was meant to make the best of Pete Townshend and Karen Townshend's fitful marriage. "I was able to very easily put into words something that had actually happened to me when I was a thirty-four-year-old," he said. "It's very emotional, but it's also very straightforward and clear."

Townshend has also said that the song was inspired by an encounter with his spiritual guru, Meher Baba's, secretary, Adi Irani.

Pete Townshend also said that he preferred "A Little Is Enough" to his US top nine hit "Let My Love Open The Door" by saying that "Let My Love Open The Door" was just a "ditty".

The song also makes a reference to Rémy Martin in the lyrics "I'm like a connoisseur of champagne cognac, the perfume nearly beats the taste."

Release and reception
"A Little is Enough" was released on the 1980 Empty Glass album, where it was the eighth track on the album. The track was then released as the second US single from said album, where it was backed with "Cat's in the Cupboard" (also from Empty Glass). The single was modestly successful, hitting #72. It was followed up by "Rough Boys" in America. The single wasn't released in Britain, where another single from Empty Glass, "Keep On Working" was issued instead.

Record World called it a "stunning triumph" and said that "the vocal urgency is awesome."  "A Little Is Enough" was cited as a highlight from Empty Glass by AllMusic's Stephen Thomas Erlewine.

Chart performance

Weekly charts

References

1980 singles
Pete Townshend songs
Songs written by Pete Townshend
Song recordings produced by Pete Townshend
1980 songs
Atco Records singles